Chinese plum is a common name for several plants and may refer to:

 Prunus mume
 Prunus salicina, native to China
 Loquat, Eriobotrya japonica